Labuništa is a village in the municipality of Struga, North Macedonia.

Name
Labuništa is an old name dating back to the time of the arrival of Slavic peoples to the Balkans. The origins of the name Labuništa are Greco-Latin from the toponym Albanopolis. Pianka Włodzimierz connects the placename Labuništa with a south-western Balkans settlement of antiquity named Albanopolis, a city marked on an ancient map by Roman geographer Ptolemy. Through metathesis the name Albanopolis entered Slavic where the suffix polis meaning city became išta with dual meanings of either being a patronymic or indicating a place. While the form Alban, a name, underwent metathesis and became Labun in Slavic of which the syllable cluster an became un giving the final form as Labun(išta).

Geography 

The nearest villages to Labuništa include Podgorci, Boroec, Vevčani and Oktisi. The village is located close to the Black Drim river and the Globočica lake.

Demographics
Labuništa is inhabited by Orthodox Christian Macedonians, Macedonian Muslims (Torbeš), Bosniaks, and Albanians.   http://www.stat.gov.mk/Publikacii/knigaX.pdf

Demographic History

According to Vasil Kanchov's study of Macedonia in 1900, "Macedonia, Ethnography and Statistics",, counted the village as having 660 Bulgarian Christian and 800 Muslim (Torbeš) inhabitants.

According to the statistics of geographers Dimitri Mishev and D. M. Brancoff, the village had a total Christian population of 640 in 1905, consisting of 512 Serbomans Patriarchist Bulgarians and 128 Exarchist Bulgarians. According to 1961 data by anthropologist Joel Halpern the village's population was composed of 2,345 Macedonian Muslims and 380 Christian Macedonians.

The population of the village in past censuses:

Demographics today
According to the 2002 national census, 8,935 people live in the village. According to the 2002 census, in Labuništa lived:

 Macedonians: 1,149 
 Turks: 1,618
 Albanians: 4,935
 Bosniaks: 72
 Roma: 3
 Vlachs: 8
 Serbs: 1
 other: 1,149

Regarding the mother tongue of the population, the following results were given:

 Macedonian: 4,872 or 82%
 Albanian: 925 or 15,5%
 Turkish: 78 or 1,31%
 Serbian: 3 or 0,05%
 other: 58 or 0,97%

Identity
Common language and origin with Macedonian Christians does not play a role for a majority of Macedonian Muslims regarding self identification which is based on common religion (Islam) that in Labuništa has led to self declarations of being Albanian. Attempts have been made to introduce the Albanian language in schooling, though these endeavours were not widely supported in Labuništa.

Sports
Local football club FK Labunishta plays in the Macedonian Second League (West Division).

Notable people
Mehmed Ali Pasha (1769 - 1840) - Ottoman Pasha, (possibly from Kavala)
Stojan Krstev/Кrstić (:bg:Стоян Кръстев), (? - 1890) - priest
Đorđe Cvetković Drimkolski (possibly Georgi Cvetkov), (1860 - 1905) - revolutionary, military commander
Andjelko Krstić, (1871 - 1952) - writer and playwright
Ilija Ilić, (1879 - 1942) - Volunteer from Thessaloniki
Đorđe Cvetković Drimkolski (possibly Georgi Cvetkov), (1860 - 1905) - revolutionary, military commander
Stoyan Gyurchinov (:bg:Стоян Гюрчинов), (? - 1927) - priest
Nikola А. Anđelković, (1902 - 1944) - Serb Chetnik military commander in WW2
Murat Labunishta :mk:Мурат Лабуништа, (1912 - 1946) - poet, politician
Milisav Antonijević - Drimkolski (:sr:Милисав Антонијевић - Дримколски) (1913 - 2001), teacher and writer
Naum Petreski (:mk:Наум Петрески) (1966) - folk singer
Menil Velioski, (2001) - folk singer
Bashkim Bashkimi, (1964) - sociologist, first doctor of sciences

See also 
Macedonian Muslims
Albanization

References

Further reading

External links 

 Website of Labuništa village (1) 
 Website of Labuništa village (2) 

Villages in Struga Municipality
Macedonian Muslim villages
Albanian communities in North Macedonia